The 1973 United Nations Security Council election was held on 15 October 1973 during the Twenty-eighth session of the United Nations General Assembly, held at United Nations Headquarters in New York City. The General Assembly elected the Byelorussian SSR, Cameroon, Costa Rica, Iraq, and Mauritania, as the five new non-permanent members of the UN Security Council for two-year mandates commencing on 1 January 1974. This was the first election of Cameroon, Costa Rica and Mauritania and the only election of Byelorussian SSR into the council.

Rules
The Security Council has 15 seats, filled by five permanent members and ten non-permanent members. Each year, half of the non-permanent members are elected for two-year terms. A sitting member may not immediately run for re-election.

In accordance with the rules whereby the ten non-permanent UNSC seats rotate among the various regional blocs into which UN member states traditionally divide themselves for voting and representation purposes, the five available seats are allocated as follows:

Two for African countries (held by Guinea and Sudan)
One for the Asian Group (now the Asia-Pacific Group), for the "Arab Swing Seat"  (held by India)
One for Latin America and the Caribbean (held by Panama)
One for the Eastern European Group (held by Yugoslavia)

To be elected, a candidate must receive a two-thirds majority of those present and voting. If the vote is inconclusive after the first round, three rounds of restricted voting shall take place, followed by three rounds of unrestricted voting, and so on, until a result has been obtained. In restricted voting, only official candidates may be voted on, while in unrestricted voting, any member of the given regional group, with the exception of current Council members, may be voted on.

Candidates
Speaking as Chairmen of the Asian and African Groups respectively, Mr. Sharaf of Jordan endorsed Iraq, and Mr. Ramphul of Mauritius endorsed Mauritania and Cameroon as the official candidates of their respective regional groups.

Result
The election was managed by then-President of the United Nations General Assembly Leopoldo Benites of Ecuador. The United Nations had 136 member states at this time (for a timeline of UN membership, see Enlargement of the United Nations). Delegates were to write the names of the five member states they wished elected on the ballot papers. Voting was conducted on a single ballot. There were 125 ballot papers.

Source:

See also
List of members of the United Nations Security Council
Soviet Union and the United Nations

References

External links
UN Document A/59/881 Note Verbale from the Permanent Mission of Costa Rica containing a record of Security Council elections up to 2004

1973 elections
1973
Non-partisan elections
1973 in international relations